Carlos Varela Aguirre (2 January 1918 – 8 September 1964) was a Chilean footballer. He played in twelve matches for the Chile national football team from 1945 to 1949. He was also part of Chile's squad for the 1947 South American Championship.

References

External links
 

1918 births
1964 deaths
Chilean footballers
Chile international footballers
Place of birth missing
Association football forwards
Audax Italiano footballers